Baone is a comune (municipality) in the Province of Padua in the Italian region Veneto, located about  southwest of Venice and about  southwest of Padua. 

Baone borders the following municipalities: Arquà Petrarca, Cinto Euganeo, Este, Galzignano Terme, Lozzo Atestino, Monselice.

References

Cities and towns in Veneto